Joe Vickery (born 29 August 1989) is an English professional rugby league footballer.

He played for the Leeds Rhinos, during which he scored 2 tries against Wakefield Trinity Wildcats in the traditional Boxing Day fixture in Dec 2012. He previously played for the St. George Illawarra Dragons and Gold Coast Titans in the National Rugby League.

On 8 August 2013 Vickery left Leeds Rhino's by mutual consent. He had joined the Rhinos on a one-year deal in December 2012 but had been out with an ankle injury since May. Vickery scored one try in 10 appearances for the Super League side.

References

External links
 

1989 births
Living people
English rugby league players
Leeds Rhinos players
Rugby league wingers
Rugby league fullbacks
Rugby league centres
Rugby league players from Devon
Shellharbour City Dragons players
Sportspeople from Exeter